In molecular biology, SNORA1 (also known as ACA1) is a member of the H/ACA class of small nucleolar RNA that guide the sites of modification of uridines to pseudouridines.

References

External links 
 
 
 Link to HUGO Gene Nomenclature Committee entry for SNORA1

Small nuclear RNA